Expander may refer to:

Dynamic range compression operated in reverse
Part of the process of signal compression
Part of the process of companding
A component used to connect SCSI computer data storage, devices together
Turboexpander, a turbine for high-pressure gas
Expander graph, a sparse graph used in the combinatorics branch of mathematics
StuffIt Expander, a computer file decompressor software utility
"Expander" (song), a 1994 song by The Future Sound of London
Orthodontic expander, a device to widen the upper jaw
Disclosure widget, a widget that hides non-essential settings or information, also known as an expander

See also
Xpander (disambiguation)